Charenton–Écoles is a station on line 8 of the Paris Métro in the commune of Charenton-le-Pont.

The station opened on 5 October 1942 with the extension of the line from Porte de Charenton. It was the eastern terminus of the line until 19 September 1970, when the line was extended to Maisons-Alfort–Stade.

Station layout

References
Roland, Gérard (2003). Stations de métro. D’Abbesses à Wagram. Éditions Bonneton.

Paris Métro stations in Charenton-le-Pont
Railway stations in France opened in 1942